Haifaa al-Mansour ( Hayfā’a al-Manṣūr; born 10 August 1974) is a Saudi Arabian film director. She is one of the country's best-known as the first female Saudi filmmaker.

Early life and education
Haifaa is the eighth (out of twelve) children of the poet Abdul Rahman Mansour, who introduced her to films by video, there being no movie theaters in Saudi Arabia between 1983 and 2018. One of her favourite actors was Jackie Chan. She is from Al Zulfi but grew up in Al-Hasa. Although her town was conservative, her father would go to a Blockbuster and grab any films that were available and bring them back home for their large family to enjoy together. Since cinema was banned in Saudi Arabia, Haifaa and her family received lots of judgment and threats from the people in her conservative town, but this never stopped her father from raising her and the other children to do things they felt passionate about. Although she grew up in a liberal family with non-traditional parents, her mother still had expectations for Haifaa to have a prestigious career. Her mother really wanted her to become a doctor, but that did not work out for Haifaa. She also tried becoming an engineer, but that also did not happen.

With her father's encouragement, she studied comparative literature at The American University in Cairo. After school, Haifaa worked at an oil company and taught English, she later completed a master's degree in Film Studies from University of Sydney, Australia.

Career
She began her filmmaking career with three shorts, Who?, The Bitter Journey and The Only Way Out. The Only Way Out won prizes in the United Arab Emirates and in the Netherlands. She followed these with the documentary Women Without Shadows, which deals with the hidden lives of women in Arab States of the Persian Gulf. It was shown at 17 international festivals. The film received the Golden Dagger for Best Documentary in the Muscat Film Festival and a special jury mention in the fourth Arab Film Festival in Rotterdam. Haifaa al-Mansour was a guest at the 28th Three Continents Festival in Nantes, France.

Her feature debut, Wadjda, which she wrote as well as directed, made its world premiere at the 2012 Venice Film Festival; it is the first full-length feature to be shot entirely in Saudi Arabia and as of 2013, the only feature-length film made in Saudi Arabia by a female director. Wadjda tells the story of a 10-year-old girl growing up in the suburbs of Riyadh, who dreams of owning and riding a green bicycle. Wadjda took five years to be made because of the typical constraints and challenges Haifaa went through to get this film out into the world. The segregation of men and women in Saudi Arabia forced her to direct this film in a van. She would be in a tight van with a monitor and walkie-talkie yelling at people and telling them what to do. She said it was a very difficult and frustrating experience but the most important thing to her was that she was the first female Saudi Arabian filmmaker who created the first feature film, fully filmed in Saudi Arabia.The film was backed by Rotana, the film production company of Prince Al-Waleed bin Talal. Wadjda was selected as the Saudi Arabian entry for the Best Foreign Language Film at the 86th Academy Awards, which is the first time Saudi Arabia has submitted a film for the Best Foreign Language Oscar. The project had been developed in 2009 during the Gulf screenwriting lab, a collaboration between TorinoFilmLab and Dubai International Film Festival. Seven years later, she made her fourth feature film, The Perfect Candidate, in 2019 which was the first feature film to be supported by the new national Saudi Film Council.

She did not intend that her film work focus on women's issues, but found them too important to not address. Both Who? and Women Without Shadows deal with the custom of abaya. She has received hate mail and criticism for being unreligious, which she denies. She does, however, feel that Saudi Arabia needs to take a more critical view of its culture. She also received praise from Saudis for encouraging discussion on topics usually considered taboo. Haifaa often makes films about strong, independent, and resilient women because she is that kind of woman too. Haifaa luckily had her supportive family, but those that surrounded her maintained the conservative politics in that town and condemned her for seeking film when it was haram (forbidden in Islamic religion). Regardless, she did what she loved and continued making films about women who wanted to change the way women in Saudi Arabia are perceived and what they are allowed to do.

In 2014, it was reported that Al-Mansour was to direct A Storm in the Stars, an upcoming romantic drama film about the early life of writer Mary Shelley. The film was later retitled Mary Shelley and premiered at the 2017 Toronto International Film Festival.

Al-Mansour next announced she was on board to direct Nappily Ever After, an adaptation of the book of the same name by Trisha R. Thomas.

She was selected to be on the jury for the Un Certain Regard section of the 2015 Cannes Film Festival.

In January 2019, Al-Mansour "received a Crystal Award at the World Economic Forum's 2019 meeting in Davos for her leadership in cultural transformation in the Arab world."

In April 2020, it was announced that she would direct Netflix's upcoming film The Selection, based on the first entry in Kiera Cass’ popular book series. In 2020, she directed an episode on The Good Lord Bird.

Personal life 
Haifaa al-Mansour lived in Bahrain for some years, and eventually moved to California with her husband, Bradley Niemann, an American diplomat, and their two children, Adam and Haylie.

Filmography
Short film

Feature film

Television

References

External links

Helen Manz
Living people
The American University in Cairo alumni
Helen Manz
Helen Manz